Machangying Town is a town located on the western portion of Pinggu District, Beijing, China. It shares border with Yukou and Daxingzhuang Towns in its north, Pinggu Town in its east, Donggaocun and Mafang Towns in its south, as well as Dasungezhuang and Zhang Towns in its west. Its population was 16,794 in 2020. 

Its name is taken from Machangying Village, where the town's government is situated.

History

Administrative divisions 
By the end of 2021, Machangying Town had 18 subdivisions, more specifically 1 community and 17 villages. These subdivisions are listed as follows:

See also 

 List of township-level divisions of Beijing

References 

Pinggu District
Towns in Beijing